The St Mary of the Isle Church is a parish of the Roman Catholic Church located in the city of Douglas, Isle of Man. It is part of the Roman Catholic Pastoral Area of St Maughold, in the Archdiocese of Liverpool, and the largest parish on the Isle of Man, a dependency of the British Crown.

The parish church was completed in 1859. The church organ is over 100 years old, and was restored in 2006 by Peter Jones.

The church, built 1857–59, is one of the Registered Buildings of the Isle of Man.

See also
 Catholic Church in the Isle of Man

References

Saint Mary
Buildings and structures in Douglas, Isle of Man
Roman Catholic churches completed in 1859
Churches in the Isle of Man
Registered Buildings of the Isle of Man
19th-century Roman Catholic church buildings in the United Kingdom
Henry Clutton buildings